Cambridge City Lincoln High School is a 9-12 public high school located near Cambridge City, Indiana. The mascot is the Golden Eagles, and the school competes in the Tri-Eastern Conference.

Notable alumni 
Theodore Rappaport - electrical engineer

See also
 List of high schools in Indiana

References

External links
School website

Schools in Wayne County, Indiana
Public high schools in Indiana